Gornja Stubica is a village and municipality in Krapina-Zagorje County, Croatia. According to the 2011 census, it has 5,284 inhabitants. The absolute majority of them are Croats.

Gornja Stubica is twinned with:

 Slovenske Konjice, Slovenia (since 2013)

References

Populated places in Krapina-Zagorje County
Municipalities of Croatia